Saint Brónach (sometimes anglicised to Bronagh) was a 6th-century holy woman from Ireland, the reputed founder and patron saint of Cell Brónche ("church of Brónach"), now Kilbroney, in County Down, Northern Ireland.

Life
A disciple of Saint Patrick, she built a refuge for sailors who were shipwrecked in Carlingford Lough. The ringing of Bronach’s bell warned of a rising storm on the dangerous waters of the Lough. About 150 years ago a storm brought down a large old oak tree in the Kilbroney churchyard, and in its branches was found a 10th-century bell. The bell is now in the local church in Rostrevor.

Lying in Glenn Sechis, a mountain valley in County Down (near Rostrevor), Cell Brónche lay at some distance from the major political centres of the region. It may have been a nunnery in origin, but later came to serve as a pastoral church manned by nuns as well as one or several priests. It was chosen as the parish church of Glenn Sechis. A high cross which survives among the ruins of Cell Brónche attests to the importance of her church. It is made of Mourne granite and stands over the traditional site of her grave in the old cemetery. It is part of the "Saint Patrick’s Trail". The building suffered damage during the 1641 Rebellion, as well as in Cromwellian times.

There is a stained glass window depicting Bronach in All Saints Church, Ballymena.

According to the genealogies of the saints, she is the mother of Saint Mo Chóe of Nendrum and herself a daughter of Míliucc maccu Buain.

In the Irish martyrologies (O'Clery, Martyrology of Tallaght, note added to Félire Óengusso), her feast day is 2 April.

References

Primary sources

Further reading

External links
Kilbroney High-cross, Megalithic Ireland
"The Irish Way: St Bronach's Land", clip from BBC History

512 deaths
5th-century Christian mystics
5th-century Irish nuns
6th-century Christian mystics
6th-century Irish nuns
Medieval saints of Ulster
People from County Down
Roman Catholic mystics
Year of birth unknown